De La Salle Collegiate High School is an all-boys Catholic high school run by the De La Salle Christian Brothers.  Founded in 1926, the school was located on the east side of Detroit before moving to its current location in Warren, Michigan, in 1982.

History

The school first opened in 1926. The first class graduated in 1929.

Notable alumni

Alex Avila, Major League Baseball catcher for the Arizona Diamondbacks (attended but did not graduate)
Joseph LoDuca '70, Emmy Award-winning movie and television score composer.
Brian Maisonneuve '91, former Hermann Trophy winner and former professional soccer player with the Columbus Crew
J.P. McCarthy '50, former Detroit radio personality, WJR Radio
Mike Peplowski '88, former Michigan State and professional (NBA) basketball player
Steve Phillips '81, former New York Mets General Manager; former ESPN Baseball Tonight analyst
Robert L. Poxon, awarded the Congressional Medal of Honor for his actions in Vietnam
William Pulte '50, Chairman, Pulte Homes; Ranked #754 on Forbes Magazine list of World's Billionaires.
Bill Sheridan '77, Miami Dolphins' Inside Linebacker Coach, was part of the New York Giants' Super Bowl XLII Champion team as a Linebackers coach. He later served as the Detroit Lions linebackers' coach.
Sam Viviano '71, Art Director, Mad Magazine
Craig Wolanin '85, former National Hockey League player, won the Stanley Cup with the Colorado Avalanche in 1996.
 Jerry McCabe '83, former National Football League player for the New England Patriots and Kansas City Chiefs
 Keith Karpinski '84, former National Football League player for the Detroit Lions; member of the 1986 National Champion Penn State University football team.
 Chris Godfrey '76, former National Football League player for the New York Jets, New York Giants, and Seattle Seahawks who was a starting Offensive Lineman for the Super Bowl XXI winning Giants
 Michael D. MacDonald ‘98, State Senator from Michigan’s 10th Senate District
 Danny DeKeyser '08, formerly  a National Hockey League defenseman for the Detroit Red Wings.
 Michael Danna ‘15, Defensive End for the Kansas City Chiefs

Notes and references

External links
 Official Website

Roman Catholic Archdiocese of Detroit
Lasallian schools in the United States
Educational institutions established in 1926
Catholic secondary schools in Michigan
Schools in Macomb County, Michigan
Boys' schools in Michigan
1926 establishments in Michigan
Warren, Michigan